Springtown is an unincorporated community in Greenwich Township, in Cumberland County, New Jersey, United States.

Springtown, and the nearby community of Othello, were both founded shortly after the American Revolution by African Americans.

History
Legislation enacted in 1786 enabled Quakers living in Greenwich Township to sell tracts of land to "free negros".  Many African Americans soon located to Springtown, and the community became a center of abolitionist activity.  Harriet Tubman frequented Springtown from 1849 to 1853, and the settlement was an important station on the Underground Railroad, with five of Cumberland County's seven "station masters" living there.

The Bethel African Methodist Episcopal Church in Springtown offered lodging to fugitive slaves traveling north after leaving Delaware and Maryland's Eastern Shore.

References

Greenwich Township, Cumberland County, New Jersey
African-American history of New Jersey
Populated places on the Underground Railroad
Unincorporated communities in Cumberland County, New Jersey
Unincorporated communities in New Jersey